Caroline Corby (born 27 January 1965) is the Chair of the Parole Board for England and Wales and the Chair of the Professional Standards Authority for Health and Social Care.

Early life
Caroline Corby was born on 27 January 1965. She grew up in North London. She has a degree in mathematics and statistics.

Career
Caroline Corby’s early career was in private equity in the City of London. During this time she served on a number of private sector boards across a range of industries.

She left the City in 2000 for a career break to raise her three daughters. During this period she had six historical books published in the Before They Were Famous series.

In 2007 she joined the board of London Probation Trust (LPT) and she was chair from 2012-2014. LPT worked with over 60,000 offenders a year to protect the public and reduce re-offending.

Caroline Corby joined the Management Committee of the Parole Board in 2015 and became chair in April 2018, succeeding Nick Hardwick. The Parole Board is an independent body which decides whether prisoners in England and Wales can be safely released into the community. It determines around 15,000 cases each year. It has around 300 members who make the assessments and decisions. These members are supported by 130 staff.

In 2021 Caroline Corby became chair of the Professional Standards Authority (PSA). The PSA reviews the work of the ten statutory regulators of health and care professionals, accredits organisations that register health and care practitioners in unregulated occupations and gives policy advice and encourages research to improve regulation.

Caroline Corby has been a board member (2014-2019) of the Criminal Cases Review Commission, which reviews possible miscarriages of criminal justice in England, Wales and Northern Ireland, She has been a board member of Cafcass, (2014-2021) which safeguards the welfare of children in the Family Courts in England. Caroline Corby has also been a panel chair for a number of the statutory regulators including the Nursing and Midwifery Council and the General Social Care Council.

She was a magistrate from 2006-2010.

Selected publications
 Julius Caesar: The Curse of the Gods 
 William the Conqueror: Nowhere to Hide
 Pocahontas: The Prophecy of Doom: A Princess Betrayed
 Boudica: The Secrets of the Druids
 Lady Jane Grey: Queen for Sale
 Cleopatra: Escape Down the Nile

References

1965 births
British chief executives
British women
English justices of the peace
British children's writers
Living people